Artavasdes III was a king of the Kingdom of Armenia who ruled from 5 to 2 BC. He was the son of King Artavasdes II and succeeded his father upon his death.

During his reign, Artavasdes III had to deal with a number of challenges. One of the most significant was the growing power of Rome, which was expanding its territory and influence throughout the region. Artavasdes III sought to maintain Armenia's independence and neutrality by playing off the various powers in the region against each other. However, his efforts were ultimately unsuccessful.

In 2 BC, the Roman general Marcus Vinicius arrived in Armenia with an army, demanding that Artavasdes III submit to Roman authority. Artavasdes III refused, and a brief war ensued. Artavasdes III was eventually defeated and taken captive by the Romans, who installed his brother Tigranes III as the new king of Armenia.

Artavasdes III was later executed by the Romans in 1 BC, as they viewed him as a threat to their authority in the region. His death marked the end of the Artaxiad dynasty, which had ruled Armenia since the 2nd century BC.

References 

Artaxiad dynasty
Armenian kings